Charles Nicolas François Brisout de Barneville (22 July 1822, in Paris – 2 May 1893, in St. Germain-en-Laye) was a French entomologist who specialised in Orthoptera and Coleoptera.

He was President of the Société entomologique de France in 1873. His collections are kept by the Society.

References 

French entomologists
Presidents of the Société entomologique de France
1893 deaths
1822 births